Khors is a Slavic deity.

Khors may also refer to:
 Khors (band), a Ukrainian metal band
 Khors Air, a Ukrainian airline

See also 
 
 Hors (disambiguation)
 Khor (disambiguation)